The 2013 OSN Cup was an association football tournament held in Riyadh, Saudi Arabia from 5 September 2013 to 9 September 2013.  The tournament was organized by the Saudi Arabian Football Federation and sponsored by the Middle Eastern and North African TV network OSN. This was the premier edition of the tournament. New Zealand, Saudi Arabia, Trinidad and Tobago and the United Arab Emirates were invited to the tournament. All matches were held at the King Fahd International Stadium  About the tournament, SAFF president Ahmed Eid Al-Harbi said, "Our goal is to promote the culture of football in the Kingdom, set more platforms for our talented team to demonstrate their skills and to encourage new talent to step forward and be proud participants in Saudi Arabia’s modern football history." The United Arab Emirates were crowned champions after defeating New Zealand 2–0 in the final.

Squads

Brackets

Semi-finals

Third place play-off

Final

Goalscorers
3 goals
 Kenwyne Jones
2 goals
 Ahmed Khalil
 Ali Mabkhout
1 goal

 Naif Hazazi
 Chris Killen
 Andre Boucaud
 Kevin Molino
 Willis Plaza
 Habib Fardan

References

  
2013
2013–14 in Saudi Arabian football
2013–14 in Trinidad and Tobago football
2013–14 in Emirati football
2013–14 in New Zealand association football